Minuscule 231 (in the Gregory-Aland numbering), ε 1207 (Soden), is a Greek minuscule manuscript of the New Testament, on parchment. Paleographically it has been assigned to the 12th century.

Description 

The codex contains a complete text of the four Gospels, on 181 parchment leaves (size ). The leaves are arranged in quarto (four leaves in quire). The text is written in one column per page, 29 lines per page.

There are some marginal glosses made by a later hand, and a Latin version of parts of Matthew (between lines of Greek text). The text of the Pericope Adulterae (John 7:53-8:11) was marked by an obelus by a later hand.

Text 

The Greek text of the codex is a representative of the Byzantine text-type. Hermann von Soden classified it to the textual family Kx. Aland placed it in Category V.

According to the Claremont Profile Method it represents textual family Kx in Luke 1, Luke 10, and Luke 20.

History 

The manuscript was described by Daniel Gotthilf Moldenhawer, who collated it about 1783 for Andreas Birch (Esc. 10). It was briefly described by Emmanuel Miller in 1848.

It is currently housed at the Escurial (Cod. Escurialensis, y. III. 6).

See also 

 List of New Testament minuscules
 Biblical manuscript
 Textual criticism

References

Further reading 

 Emmanuel Miller, Catalogue des manuscrits grecs de la bibliothèque de l'Escurial (Paris 1848), p. 281.
 

Greek New Testament minuscules
12th-century biblical manuscripts